Wells County Courthouse in Fessenden, North Dakota is a two-story Queen Anne style courthouse built in 1895.  It was listed on the National Register of Historic Places in 1977.

It was designed by John W. Ross (1848-1914).
According to its NRHP nomination, the building "is stylistically significant for its Queen Anne design, and particularly so as an uncommon example in the state of the "urban" expression of that mode: brick fabric, with soaring, parapeted chimneys."

References

External links

Courthouses on the National Register of Historic Places in North Dakota
County courthouses in North Dakota
Queen Anne architecture in North Dakota
Government buildings completed in 1895
National Register of Historic Places in Wells County, North Dakota
1895 establishments in North Dakota